The 1989 Women's NCM World Team Squash Championships were held in Warmond, in the Netherlands and took place from March 14 until March 19, 1989.

Results

First round

Pool A

Pool B

Quarter finals

Semi finals

Third Place Play Off

Final 

Cardwell conceded the third rubber*

References

See also 
World Team Squash Championships
World Squash Federation
World Open (squash)

World Squash Championships
1989 in women's squash
Squash tournaments in the Netherlands
International sports competitions hosted by the Netherlands
Squash
Women
Women's World Team Squash Championships